Nikita Storojev  is a Russian bass opera singer.

Life 
Nikita was born in 1950 in Harbin, China. His family moved back to Russia in 1955. He studied philosophy at the University of Sverdlovsk from 1970-1972, but then turned to music, studying voice at the Mussorgsky Conservatory of Yekaterinburg from 1972-1975, and then at the Moscow Conservatory from 1975-1978. Among his teachers were Ian Voutiras and renowned Russian bass Evgeny Nesterenko. Upon winning the prestigious Tchaikovsky Competition, he became principal soloist for 5 years in the Bolshoi Theatre and the Moscow Philharmonic Society.

Nikita Storojev performs in the world's major opera houses, concert halls and international festivals in Vienna, Paris, London, Milan, New York, San Francisco, Florence, Munich, Tokyo, and Berlin. His vast repertoire consists of over 50 operatic roles and more than 300 classical songs.

He has twenty-five commercial CDs and five DVDs, performed and recorded under the direction of conductors such as Mstislav Rostropovich, Vladimir Ashkenazy, Sir John Pritchard, Claudio Abbado, Neeme Jarvi, John Nelson, Marius Jansons, Gennady Rozhdestvenski etc., and with singers such as Plácido Domingo, Luciano Pavarotti etc.

Nikita now lives in Austin where he teaches voice at the Butler School of Music at the University of Texas. In the last four years, while teaching at The University of Texas, his students have won national competitions, participated in young artist programs, and begun professional careers. As a teacher, Mr. Storojev has also presented master classes around the world in Japan, Taiwan, Russia, Germany, France, Italy, and Mexico, as well as in the United States. Nikita still travels the world performing in various concerts and productions. Highlights of Mr. Storojev’s recent opera appearances include The Police Sergeant in Lady Macbeth of Mtsensk with San Francisco Opera, Teatro alla Scala, Opéra National de Paris, Opera Monte Carlo, and De Nederlandse Opera; the title role in Boris Godunov with the Komische Oper Berlin, Budapest Festival, and with the Orquesta Sinfónica Nacional de México; King Dodon in Tchaikovsky’s Le Coq d’Or with the Mariinsky Theatre; and Bedyai in Rimsky-Korsakov’s The Invisible City of Kitezh with De Nederlandse Opera.

References

External links 
http://www.nikitastorojev.com

Living people
Russian basses
Year of birth missing (living people)